My So-Called Career in Hollywood is a darkly comedic "roman à clé" autobiography of an ill-fated TV writer named E. Klass, who tried - unsuccessfully - to sell a TV script in Hollywood for more than four decades, without every achieving success throughout his entire 'so-called' career. The book chronicles Ellery's relentless efforts to break into the industry, and his long-time relationship with his small-time, literary agent, as E. details his exploits working on - and being fired from - such classic TV shows as Lost in Space (1965–68), Land of the Giants (1968–70), Gilligan's Island, The Andy Griffith Show, and The Partridge Family to name a few, and while the character of E.Klass may be fictitious, his accounts detailed in the book are all based on true fact, making this book a rare inside look at television production of that era. My So-Called Career in Hollywood, published in 2005, was in fact written by Hollywood actor/screenwriter Timothy Williams.Published in October 2005.

References

Comedy books
2006 American novels
American autobiographical novels